Nol may refer to:

Surname 
 Lon Nol (1913–1985), Cambodian politician and general who served as Prime Minister of Cambodia
 Koen van Nol (born 1974), Dutch judoka

Given name 
 Nol Havens (born 1959), lead singer of band The Art Company
 Nol Maassen (1922–2009), Dutch politician 
 Nol de Ruiter (born 1940), Dutch football coach and former player

Localities 
 Nol, Sweden

Other 
 Nol Card, a smart card for public transport in Dubai, United Arab Emirates
 Népszabadság, a Hungarian newspaper with the website nol.hu
 Nol (lit. zero), a Russian rock band

See also
 NOL (disambiguation)
 NOLS (disambiguation)